David Gilbert (15 June 1827 – date of death unknown) was an English cricketer.  Gilbert's batting and bowling styles are unknown.  He was born at Rotherfield, Sussex.

Gilbert made his first-class debut for Sussex against Kent in 1851.  He made five further first-class appearances for Sussex, the last of which came against the Marylebone Cricket Club in 1857.  In his six first-class matches for the county, he took 4 wickets at an average of 22.50, with best figures of 3/18.  With the bat, he scored 28 runs at an average of 3.11, with a high score of 8.

He also made a single first-class appearance for a combined Kent and Sussex team against an All England XI in 1853.  He took figures of 3/18 from nine overs in the All England Eleven's first-innings, while in their second-innings he took 1/3 from four overs.  The match ended in a draw.

References

External links
David Gilbert at ESPNcricinfo
David Gilbert at CricketArchive

1827 births
Year of death missing
People from Rotherfield
English cricketers
Sussex cricketers